Métro Châtelet, Direction Cassiopée (Métro Châtelet, Direction Cassiopeia) is volume nine in the French comic book (or bande dessinée) science fiction series Valérian and Laureline created by writer Pierre Christin and artist Jean-Claude Mézières.

Synopsis
Alone on the astroship, Laureline departs the planet Rubanis, in the Constellation of Cassiopeia, having obtained the information she requires for the spatio-temporal agent's latest mission.  Rendezvousing with the Apominobas merchants, they tell her of swindlers who are selling dangerous technologies.  Leaving the Apominobas, she continues to her destination: the planet Solum.  Using a telepathic link provided by Galaxity, she communicates with Valérian to keep him up to date with her progress.

Valérian is sitting in a café in Paris, 20th century Earth, waiting for Galaxity's contact, Mr Albert, to arrive.  Albert enters the café and seats himself beside Valerian.  He has news: strange things have been happening on the Métro – a presence at Auber station, a sighting at Nation station and now a derailment at Châtelet.  Valérian and Albert leave the café and make for the metro station.  Arriving they are told that the station is closed but manage to slip down onto the platform.  Valérian proceeds down the tunnel to where the train derailed.  Remaining behind at the platform, Albert observes a group of men – some of whom appear to be businessmen – heading down the tunnel as well.  Valérian sees a light ahead of him in the tunnel and is suddenly confronted by a fire-breathing dragon.  Pulling a futuristic rifle from his trench coat, he opens fire on the apparition which, he realizes, is made of pure energy.  There is an explosion and Valérian is thrown to the ground, unconscious.

Waiting outside the station, Albert is concerned that Valérian has been away too long. The group of men he saw at the station emerge, looking displeased, get into their vehicles, which include a van marked “Bellson & Gambler”, and drive off.  Shortly afterwards, an ambulance draws up and Valérian is carried out of the station on a stretcher.  Albert follows the ambulance to the hospital where he convinces the doctors that he is Valérian's uncle and manages to get him discharged, telling the gendarmes that Valérian is weak-minded and believes he is an intergalactic detective.  Later, at dinner, they review what has happened: they cannot think of a connection between the apparition on the Métro, the incident that brought Valérian to the 20th century in the first place – an apparition of a muddy monster at a mine in Lorraine and Laureline's investigations in Cassiopeia.  As they walk back to his hotel, Valérian complains of headaches arising from his telepathic communications with Laureline.

In his hotel room, Valérian contacts Laureline who has reached the planet Solum.  The ground on the planet is porous and ever-changing, and its inhabitants are engaged in incessant rebuilding of their ever-sinking city, adding layer upon layer.  Each layer contains a living memory who records the history of the planet and Laureline is moving deeper and deeper trying to find a history who can give them a lead on the incidents that are happening on Earth.

Valérian is woken by the phone in his room. It is Albert, ringing to warn him that his hotel is under observation by the police and by a second, unknown, group.  Valérian slips out of the hotel via the roof and meets Albert in a taxi at the end of the road.  The taxi takes them to a railway station where they get a train to Marais Poitevin where sightings of a monster have been reported in the marshes.

Sleeping on the train, Valérian resumes contact with Laureline.  One of the histories on Solum has told her a story about a planet called Ohuru which was plagued, and eventually destroyed, by similar apparitions.  The history also tells Laureline of a link between the planet Ohuru and the planet Zomuk – the dumping ground of the universe.  The inhabitants are noted for the sanctuaries that they construct from the materials deposited on their planet.  Laureline is told that some artifacts from Ohuru have landed up on Zomuk and she is now heading there to investigate.

Arriving at Marais Poitevin, Valérian and Albert try to book into a hotel but find that it has been booked out by representatives, from United States, of a multinational company called W.A.A.M. who have gone on an excursion into the marshes.  Following them into the marshes, Albert muses on the two corporations – Bellson & Gambler and now W.A.A.M. who appear to be mixed up in this affair.  Albert believes the second car that was watching Valérian's hotel was from Bellson & Gambler.  They meet a farm-boy, Jean-René, in the marsh who tells them that the men from W.A.A.M. are looking in the wrong place.  He offers to take Valérian to where the monster is but only if Valérian will give him his rifle and allow him to make the first shot at the beast.  Valérian, reluctantly, agrees and they set off into the marsh.  The monster, which resembles a whale, appears but Jean-René's shot just bounces off its hide.  Jean-René is knocked out by the recoil from the gun but Valérian grabs the rifle and opens fire, killing the monster.

Returning to Paris, Albert brings Valérian to his house where one of his carrier pigeons has arrived with a message from Chatelard, an old friend of Albert's and a philosopher of science and mythology.  Driving to Chatelard's house, Valérian and Albert are greeted by the old man who tells them that he believes there will be one more manifestation and it will take the form of air.  He explains that there appears to be a link between the apparitions and the four classical elements – the mud monster in the mine was earth, the dragon in the Métro was fire and the creature in the marsh was water.  Chatelard also tells Albert that this is not the first time he has been asked about these manifestations – a young woman from an American research centre had previously offered him a lot of money for any information he could share.  As Valérian and Albert leave Chatelard's house, they are observed by a young, blonde woman in a car.

Back at Albert's house, Albert looks up Bellson & Gambler and W.A.A.M. in his files. Bellson & Gambler are a heavy industry corporation, involved in mining, steel and petroleum. W.A.A.M. - World American Advanced Machines – are a new economy company involved in electronics and computers.  Albert realizes that these two disparate organisations are competing with one another to gain control of the powers behind the manifestations.

Meanwhile, on Zomuk, Laureline has resumed contact with Valérian.  The most beautiful sanctuary on Zomuk has been plundered of its contents.  Gaining entry to the sanctuary, Laureline finds its main chamber empty except for representations of the four elemental forces on the walls – exactly what Chatelard spoke of.  Suddenly, the link between Valérian and Laureline is broken by an interruption from Albert.  Angry at being cut off, Valérian snaps at Albert and storms out of the house.  Valérian mopes angrily through the streets of Paris when a sports car, driven by the young woman who was watching him and Albert at Chatelard's house, pulls up.  She asks Valérian if he'd like to go dancing with him.  Valérian gets in the car and they drive off.

Continues in Brooklyn Station, Terminus Cosmos...

Main characters
 Valérian, a spatio-temporal agent from Galaxity, future capital of Earth, in the 28th century
 Laureline, originally from France in the 11th century, now a spatio-temporal agent of Galaxity in the 28th century
 Mr Albert, Galaxity's contact in 20th century Earth
 Jean-René, a farmboy from Coublée Farm in the Marais-Poitevin 
 Chatelard, a philosopher of science and myth who lives a life of self-sufficiency
 Cynthia Westerly, an employee of W.A.A.M.
 Unnamed employees of the multinationals Bellson & Gambler and W.A.A.M.

Settings
 Earth, France, year 1980
 The first manifestation appears in a mine in Havrilange in the region of Lorraine.
 Valérian meets Mr Albert in Paris. The second manifestation appears in the RER near Châtelet-Les Halles station on Line B in the direction of Saint-Rémy-lès-Chevreuse. When injured during his encounter with the monster, Valérian is taken to the Saint-Antoine University Hospital. Valérian is staying at the Hotel des Voyageurs. They leave Paris in search of the third manifestation from Gare d'Austerlitz.
 The third manifestation appears in the Marais Poitevin in the Poitou Charentes region of Western France between Doère-la-Rivière and Pré Bourru. Valérian and Albert look for a room in the Hotel du Vieux Pont in Doère-la-Rivière. Jean-René, the farmboy Valérian and Albert meet is from nearby Coublée Farm while the representatives from W.A.A.M. get lost in Flamancheries Wood.
 Albert's house is located in an unnamed suburb of the city. It contains all his secret files as well as the space-time relay he uses to stay in contact with Galaxity. In the back garden he keeps carrier pigeons which he uses to communicate in secret with some of his contacts.
 Albert's contact Chatelard lives in Saint-Martin-des-Bois in Loir-et-Cher in the Centre-Val de Loire region.
 Constellation of Cassiopeia. Laureline visits the following planets:
 Rubanis. We don't see the surface of the planet but the space traffic in orbit around it is so dense that hyperspace travel is forbidden in its environs.
 Solum. A yellow planet with rings and at least three moons. The air is soft and scented while the ground is porous and ever-changing. There is only one city on the planet which, because of the porous ground, has to be incessantly rebuilt by the insectoid Solumnians who continually add new stages on top of the existing layers. The old layers stretch deep into the heart of the planet. Each stage has an immortal living memory, resembling a giant gastropod, that retains the history of the events it has seen in that time. The deeper into the city one travels the further back in time the memories stretch.
 Zomuk. A rarely visited planet, it is mainly used as a dumping ground by other races who deposit their rubbish either on the surface or in orbit. Innumerable parasites swarm across the surface living on the garbage. The dominant species, the Zoms, live in abject poverty on the rubbish, ugly, stupid, eaten by the vermin and fanatically religious. They construct magnificent sanctuaries from the junk accumulated on their world into which they deposit their most valuable offerings. Their most beautiful sanctuary was where they kept the four elements and while it now lies empty, its walls are decorated with representations of the elements.

Notes
 This is the first Valérian story to be told over more than one album. The story concludes in Brooklyn Station, Terminus Cosmos.
 This album marks the first appearance in the series of Mr Albert, Galaxity's contact in 20th century Earth.
 We get a brief glimpse of the planet Rubanis and its incessant traffic. The series will return to this planet on several occasions in subsequent albums.
 The last frame of board number 4, the astroship with Laureline on board approaching Solum, is used as the endpaper for all of the French editions of the Valérian albums.

1980 graphic novels
Valérian and Laureline